Nitric oxide reductase (cytochrome c) is an enzyme with systematic name nitrous oxide:ferricytochrome-c oxidoreductase. This enzyme catalyses the following chemical reaction

 2 nitric oxide + 2 ferrocytochrome c + 2 H+  nitrous oxide + 2 ferricytochrome c + H2O

The enzyme from Pseudomonas aeruginosa contains a dinuclear centre.

References

External links 
 

EC 1.7.2